Morehead was a heritage streetcar station in Charlotte, North Carolina. The at-grade side platforms, located below Morehead Street, was a stop for the Charlotte Trolley in the South End neighborhood.

History 
The station began operations on August 30, 1996. Consisting of a platform area along the track, the station operated Thursday through Sunday and then daily on June 28, 2004. Service was temporarily halted on February 5, 2006; during which time the station was double-tracked and was rebuilt with signage and an emergency call box. When the station resumed on April 20, 2008, it operated on a limited schedule. When the Charlotte Trolley ended service on June 28, 2010, the Morehead station, along with three other trolley only stations, ceased operations. Being located within the Lynx Blue Line's right-of-way, the station's platform area has remained unchanged and is accessible along the Charlotte Rail Trail, with nearby stairs and walkway to Morehead Street.

References

External links

 South End Charlotte

Former Charlotte Area Transit System stations
9th Street
Railway stations in the United States opened in 1996
Railway stations closed in 2010